Enrique Parejo González (born August 13, 1930) is a former justice minister in Colombia.  A presidential candidate, González was a prominent political figure starting in the 1970s.

González was the target of an assassination attempt in Hungary while serving as the Colombian ambassador there. It was believed that drug cartels were responsible.

References

Colombian politicians
Living people
1930 births
Place of birth missing (living people)
Colombian Ministers of Justice
Ambassadors of Colombia to Hungary